Arrow Factory was an independent artist-run space located in Beijing that was active between 2008 and 2019. The 15-square-meter-space hosted site-specific exhibitions, performances, actions, interventions, and happenings, and offered a small-scale model for low-budget and experimental art making. The space was considered unconventional for its location as it was away from the known art districts in Beijing; its funding model as it was a self-reliant and non-commercial enterprise; and its display methods as it used a storefront to display artworks and made exhibitions accessible to the public twenty-hour-hours a day. The projects often hosted local residents, shopkeepers, and restaurant owners. During its 11.5 years of operations, Arrow Factory organized programs with many notable artists including Yan Lei, Nie Mu, Wei-Li Yeh, Liu Wei, Lin Yilin, and Ken Lum. The founders include artist Rania Ho, artist Wang Wei, artist Wei Weng, and curator Pauline J. Yao. Artist Wei Weng stepped away from the project in 2009. 

The space was located in Jianchang Hutong inside the Second Ring Road in Beijing and used to be a vegetable stand before it was active as an art space. It ceased operations in October 2019 after they were required to close or curtain off their storefront by the local housing office. This request was part of Beijing's new urban policies at that time that aimed at replacing small and low-end enterprises, including "non-capital functions and features."

References 

Beijing
Defunct art museums and galleries